Georgi Joseph (born 23 November 1982) is a French professional basketball player for Aix Maurienne of the LNB Pro B.

Joseph spent the 2019–20 season with the Levallois Metropolitans, averaging 3.2 points and 2.8 rebounds per game. He signed with ESSM Le Portel on 23 September 2020. In 2021, Joseph joined Tours Métropole Basket and averaged 5.4 points, 5.4 rebounds, and 1.9 assists per game. On 3 March 2022, he signed with Aix Maurienne.

Personal life
Joseph is of Haitian descent.

References

1982 births
Living people
Aix Maurienne Savoie Basket players
AS Monaco Basket players
ASVEL Basket players
Basketball players from Paris
Élan Béarnais players
Expatriate basketball people in Monaco
Forwards (basketball)
French expatriate basketball people in the United States
French men's basketball players
French sportspeople of Haitian descent
French expatriate sportspeople in Monaco
JL Bourg-en-Bresse players
Kennesaw State Owls men's basketball players
Montecatiniterme Basketball players
Orléans Loiret Basket players
Paris Racing Basket players
SIG Basket players